Mariano Duncan Nalasco (born March 13, 1963) is a retired second baseman and shortstop who played for several Major League Baseball teams during his 12-year career. He was the infield coach and first base coach for the Los Angeles Dodgers under Managers Grady Little and Joe Torre.  Duncan currently serves as the hitting coach for the Brooklyn Cyclones, the New York Mets' High-A team.

Playing career

Los Angeles Dodgers
Duncan was signed by the Los Angeles Dodgers as an undrafted free agent on January 7, 1982. He played in the Dodgers minor league system for three seasons with the Lethbridge Dodgers in 1982, Vero Beach Dodgers in 1983 and San Antonio Dodgers in 1984. He stole 56 bases for Vero Beach and 41 bases for San Antonio, and at San Antonio he tied Stu Pederson for the league lead in triples.  He made his major league debut, starting at second base, for the Dodgers on April 9, 1985 against the Houston Astros, and was 0 for 4 in his debut. He got his first major league hit on April 10 against Astros pitcher Joe Niekro.

In his rookie season, July 6, 1985, vs. St. Louis Cardinals, Duncan accomplished the rare feat of bunting for a double where the ball was untouched and did not roll beyond the base paths.  The Dodgers won the game 8-3.
 
He stole 38 bases in his rookie season and finished third in the rookie of the year voting.

Cincinnati Reds
Duncan was traded by the Dodgers to the Cincinnati Reds with Tim Leary on July 18,  for Lenny Harris and Kal Daniels.

Philadelphia Phillies
Duncan signed with the Philadelphia Phillies on April 14, 1992. He played three seasons for the Phils before being claimed off waivers by the Reds on August 8, 1995.

New York Yankees
On December 11, 1995, Duncan signed with the New York Yankees, and he spent a season and a half in New York. In his only full season in 1996, he hit .340 with 56 runs batted in.

Duncan coined the phrase, "we play today, we win today... das it!" which became the mantra for the 1996 World Series champion New York Yankees.  Many of the players wore T-shirts with the slogan under their uniforms daily.

In 1997, he played in 50 games, hitting just .244 with 13 runs batted in before being traded to the Toronto Blue Jays with cash for Angel Ramirez.

Toronto Blue Jays
Duncan was traded to the Toronto Blue Jays on July 29, 1997 for minor leaguer Angel Ramirez. He spent a half of the season with the Blue Jays.

Yomiuri Giants
Duncan played one season for the Yomiuri Giants in 1998.

Career statistics
In 1279 games over 12 seasons, Duncan compiled a .267 batting average (1247-for-4677) with 619 runs, 233 doubles, 37 triples, 87 home runs, 491 RBI, 174 stolen bases, 201 walks, 913 strikeouts, .300 on-base percentage and .388 slugging percentage. Defensively, he recorded a .963 fielding percentage, primarily at second base and shortstop. In 43 postseason games (3 World Series, 7 playoff series) he batted .243 (37-for-152) with 14 runs, 1 home run, 12 RBI and 7 stolen bases.

Highlights
Member of the Reds' 1990 World Champion team, the Phillies' 1993 National League Champion team, and the Yankees' 1996 World Champion team.

Coaching career
2003: Gulf Coast Dodgers
2004: Jacksonville Suns
2005: Las Vegas 51s
2006–2010: Los Angeles Dodgers
2011–2012: Tennessee Smokies
2013–2014: Daytona Cubs
2015–2016, 2018: Myrtle Beach Pelicans
2017: Iowa Cubs
2019: Kingsport Mets
2020: Columbia Fireflies (Season Cancelled)
2021: Brooklyn Cyclones
2022: Binghamton Rumble Ponies

See also
 List of Major League Baseball career stolen bases leaders
 List of Major League Baseball annual triples leaders

References

External links

Mariano Duncan at SABR (Baseball BioProject)
Mariano Duncan at Baseball Almanac
Mariano Duncan at Baseballbiography.com

   

1963 births
Living people
Albuquerque Dukes players
Bridgeport Bluefish players
Calgary Cannons players
Cincinnati Reds players
Columbus Clippers players
Dominican Republic baseball coaches
Dominican Republic expatriate baseball players in Canada
Dominican Republic expatriate baseball players in Japan
Dominican Republic expatriate baseball players in the United States
Dominican Republic people of Cocolo descent
Lethbridge Dodgers players
Los Angeles Dodgers coaches
Los Angeles Dodgers players
Major League Baseball first base coaches
Major League Baseball players from the Dominican Republic
Major League Baseball second basemen
Major League Baseball shortstops
Minor league baseball coaches
National League All-Stars
New York Yankees players
Nippon Professional Baseball second basemen
Nippon Professional Baseball shortstops
Nippon Professional Baseball third basemen
Sportspeople from San Pedro de Macorís
Philadelphia Phillies players
San Antonio Dodgers players
Toronto Blue Jays players
Vero Beach Dodgers players
Yomiuri Giants players